Styphlolepis is a genus of moths of the family Crambidae.

Species
Styphlolepis agenor Turner, 1915
Styphlolepis delopasta Turner, 1942
Styphlolepis erythrocosma Turner, 1942
Styphlolepis hypermegas Turner, 1922
Styphlolepis leucosticta Hampson, 1919
Styphlolepis squamosalis Hampson, 1896

References

Natural History Museum Lepidoptera genus database

Midilinae
Crambidae genera
Taxa named by George Hampson